Goin' Back to Dixie is a bluegrass album by American musician John Hartford, released in 1992 (see 1992 in music).

Track listing
 "Goin' Back To Dixie"	  
 "Little Girl With Her Hair All Down Behind"
 "I Wonder Where You Are Tonight"
 "Heavenly Sunlight"
 "M.I.S.I.P."
 "The Girl I Left Behind"
 "We Did Our Best"
 "The Boys From North Carolina" (John Hartford)
 "Them Way Long Time Ago Times"
 "The Death Of John Henry"

References

External links
LP Discography of John Hartford.

John Hartford albums
1992 albums